The 1949 British Columbia general election was the 22nd general election in the Province of British Columbia, Canada. It was held to elect members of the Legislative Assembly of British Columbia. The election was called on April 16, 1949, and held on June 15, 1949.  The new legislature met for the first time on February 14, 1950.

The centre-right coalition formed by the Liberal and Conservative parties in order to defeat the social democratic Co-operative Commonwealth Federation in the 1945 election increased its share of the vote and its majority in the legislature.

Three different social credit groupings nominated or endorsed candidates in the election: the Social Credit Party, the Social Credit League, and the Union of Electors.

Results

Notes:

* Party did not nominate candidates in the previous election.

1 Various social credit groups nominated 16 candidates in the 1945 election as part of a Social Credit "alliance". These candidates won 6,627 votes, 1.42% of the popular vote in that election.

2 The candidate, running independently from the Liberal-PC Coalition, is listed as "Conservative" rather than "Progressive Conservative" in the Statement of Votes.

Results by riding

|-
||    
|align="center"  |Angus Maclean
|align="center"  |CaribooCoalition
||    
||    
|align="center"  |AtlinCo-operative Commonwealth Fed.
|align="center"  |Frank Arthur Calder
||    
|-
||    
|align="center"  |Leslie Harvey Eyres
|align="center"  |ChilliwackCoalition
||    
||    
|align="center"  |BurnabyCo-operative Commonwealth Fed.
|align="center"  |Ernest Edward Winch
||    
|-
||    
|align="center"  |Thomas King
|align="center"  |ColumbiaCoalition
||    
||    
|align="center"  |CranbrookCo-operative Commonwealth Fed.
|align="center"  |Leo Thomas Nimsick
||    
|-
||    
|align="center"  |Andrew Mowatt Whisker
|align="center"  |Cowichan-NewcastleCoalition
||    
||    
|align="center"  |Grand Forks-GreenwoodCo-operative Commonwealth Fed.
|align="center"  |Rupert Haggen
||    
|-
||    
|align="center"  |Herbert John Welch
|align="center"  |ComoxCoalition
||    
||    
|align="center"  |Kaslo-SlocanCo-operative Commonwealth Fed.
|align="center"  |Randolph Harding
||    
|-
||    
|align="center"  |Alexander Campbell Hope
|align="center"  |DeltaCoalition
||    
||    
|align="center" rowspan=2 |Vancouver EastCo-operative Commonwealth Fed.
|align="center"  |Arthur James Turner
||    
|-
||    
|align="center"  |Roderick Charles MacDonald
|align="center"  |DewdneyCoalition
||    
||    
|align="center"  |Harold Edward Winch2
||    
|-
||    
|align="center"  |Charles Taschereau Beard
|align="center"  |EsquimaltCoalition
||    
||    
|align="center"  |FernieLabour (Party)
|align="center"  |Thomas Aubert Uphill
||    
|-
||    
|align="center"  |Henry Robson Bowman
|align="center"  |Fort GeorgeCoalition
||    
||    
|align="center"  |AlberniIndependent
|align="center"  |James Mowat
||    
|-
||    
|align="center"  |Sidney John Smith
|align="center"  |KamloopsCoalition
||    
|-
||    
|align="center"  |Ernest Crawford Carson
|align="center"  |LillooetCoalition
||    
|-
||    
|align="center"  |Battleman Milton MacIntyre
|align="center"  |MackenzieCoalition
||    
|-
||    
|align="center"  |George Sharratt Pearson
|align="center"  |Nanaimo and the IslandsCoalition
||    
|-
||    
|align="center"  |Walter Hendricks
|align="center"  |Nelson-CrestonCoalition
||    
|-
||    
|align="center"  |Byron Ingemar Johnson
|align="center"  |New WestminsterCoalition
||    
|-
||    
|align="center"  |Charles William Morrow
|align="center"  |North OkanaganCoalition
||    
|-
||    
|align="center"  |John Henry Cates
|align="center"  |North VancouverCoalition
||    
|-
||    
|align="center"  |Herbert Anscomb
|align="center"  |Oak BayCoalition
||    
|-
||    
|align="center"  |Roert Cecil Steele
|align="center"  |OminecaCoalition
||    
|-
||    
|align="center"  |Glen Everton Braden
|align="center"  |Peace RiverCoalition
||    
|-
||    
|align="center"  |John Duncan McRae
|align="center"  |Prince RupertCoalition
||    
|-
||    
|align="center"  |Arvid Lundell
|align="center"  |RevelstokeCoalition
||    
|-
||    
|align="center"  |Alexander Douglas Turnbull
|align="center"  |Rossland-TrailCoalition
||    
|-
||    
|align="center"  |Arthur James Richard Ash
|align="center"  |SaanichCoalition
||    
|-
||    
|align="center"  |Maurice Patrick Finnerty
|align="center"  |SimilkameenCoalition
||    
|-
||    
|align="center"  |Edward Tourtellotte Kenney
|align="center"  |SkeenaCoalition
||    
|-
||    
|align="center"  |William Andrew Cecil Bennett
|align="center"  |South OkanaganCoalition
||    
|-
||    
|align="center"  |Donald Cameron Brown
|align="center" rowspan=2 |Vancouver-BurrardCoalition
||    
|-
||    
|align="center"  |John Groves Gould
||    
|-
||    
|align="center"  |Donald Cameron Brown
|align="center" rowspan=2 |Vancouver-BurrardCoalition
||    
|-
||    
|align="center"  |John Groves Gould
||    
|-
||    
|align="center"  |Allan James McDonell
|align="center" rowspan=2 |Vancouver CentreCoalition
||    
|-
||    
|align="center"  |Gordon Sylvester Wismer
||    
|-
||    
|align="center"  |Albert Reginald MacDougall
|align="center" rowspan=3  |Vancouver-Point GreyCoalition
||    
|-
||    
|align="center"  |Tilly Rolston
||    
|-
||    
|align="center"  |Leigh Forbes Stevenson
||    
|-
||    
|align="center"  |Nancy Hodges
|align="center" rowspan=3  |Victoria CityCoalition
||    
|-
||    
|align="center"  |Daniel John Proudfoot
||    
|-
||    
|align="center"  |William Thomas Straith
||    
|-
||    
|align="center"  |John Joseph Alban Gillis
|align="center"  |YaleCoalition
||    
|-
|-
|
|align="center"|1  Premier-Elect and Incumbent
|
|
|
|
|-
|
|align="center"|2  Leader of the Opposition
|-
| align="center" colspan="10"|Source:''' Elections BC
|-
|}

See also
List of British Columbia political parties

1949
British Columbia general election 
General election 
British Columbia general election